The 1923 Baylor Bears football team represented Baylor University in the Southwest Conference (SWC) during the 1923 college football season. In its fourth and final season under head coach Frank Bridges, the Baylor football team compiled a 5–1–2 record (1–1–2 against conference opponents), finished in fourth place in the conference, and outscored opponents by a combined total of 104 to 39. The team's sole loss was to SMU by a 16–0 score in the final game of the season.

The team played its home games at Carroll Field in Waco, Texas. Roy Carter Williamson was the team captain.

Schedule

References

Baylor
Baylor Bears football seasons
Baylor Bears football